In mathematics, the Auslander algebra of an algebra A is the endomorphism ring of the sum of the indecomposable modules of A. It was introduced by .

An Artin algebra Γ is called an Auslander algebra if gl dim Γ ≤ 2 and if 0→Γ→I→J→K→0 is a minimal injective resolution of Γ then I and J are projective  Γ-modules;

References

Representation theory